The Beatniks are an alternative rock duo formed by Yellow Magic Orchestra drummer/singer Yukihiro Takahashi and Keiichi Suzuki. The duo's debut album featured vocals mostly in English, with the rest in French.

In 2017, the band recorded the theme song for NHK TV's J-Melo, 'Softly Softly', in collaboration with Leo Imai.

In 2018 the band released their first album in seven years, Exitentialist A Xie Xie. They then undertook live performances, despite Takahashi recently having had surgery on his eyes.

Albums
 Exitentialism (1981) Vap
 The Beatniks (1982) Statik
 Exitentialist A Go-Go (1987) Pony Canyon
 Another High Exit (1994) Vap (Remix of Exitentialism)
 The Show Vol.4 - Yohji Yamamoto Collection Music (1996)
 Mri: Musical Resonance Imaging (2001) Pony Canyon
 LAST TRAIN TO EXITOWN (2011)  EMI Music Japan
 Exitentialist A Xie Xie (2018) Pony Canyon

Singles
 No Way Out/Le robinet 7" Vap 0018-07 (1981)
 River in the Ocean/Ark Diamant 7" Vap 10053-07 (1982)
 TOTAL RECALL/Chotto tsurainda (1987)

References

External links
 The Beatniks Official website
 

Japanese musical duos
Japanese alternative rock groups
Musical groups from Tokyo